The Grocery Manufacturers of America (GMA) is a food lobby group. It has existed since at least 1946. GMA "was the largest contributor of honoraria to US Senators in 1976". It was referred to as "the (American) food industry's power broker" in 1979, when its membership roll included 134 large corporations. In 1985, the Grocery Manufacturers of America was an incorporated association in Delaware. The GMA is (or has) a Political Action Committee.

History

In 1979, the GMA opposed product sell-by regulations created by the Massachusetts Department of Public Health right into the Massachusetts Supreme Judicial Court. Judge Herbert P. Wilkins declared for five justices in favour of the regulator.

In 1979, the GMA aimed to stop the Federal Trade Commission (FTC) "from restricting television commercials of sugared products aimed at children".

The St. Louis Post-Dispatch reported in 1994 that "GMA opposed labels on dairy products derived from cows injected with Monsanto’s Bovine Growth Hormone (rBGH)".

In 1995, the GMA favoured the synthetic hormone rBST or rBGH and said their use was "completely safe."

In 2005, paper producer Kimberly-Clark corporation bragged about the appointment of CEO Thomas J. Falk to the Board of Directors of the GMA. At the time, "42 CEOs representing the nation's leading food, beverage and consumer product companies and sales agencies" were on the board.

In July 2005, the GMA changed its name to the Grocery Manufacturers Association.

In January 2007, the GMA merged with the Food Products Association.

At some time between 2013 and 2018, the GMA decided to hide the list of its contributors.

The GMA supported Senator Pat Roberts when he introduced a biotech labeling and GMO foods bill on February 19, 2016. The bill (now Public Law 114-214) established a standardized voluntary labeling plan that would block the state of Vermont from enacting its mandatory genetic engineering labeling law on July1. In addition it seeks to promote "consumer acceptance of agricultural biotechnology".

The Consumer Brands Association was formed in 2020 "to adopt a proactive agenda".

By 2021, the Grocery Manufacturers of America Inc still had a listing at Bloomberg News. It was said that it "operates as a non-profit organization".

References

Lobbying in the United States